Carrie Schopf (born 13 April 1957) is an American-born Armenian dressage rider. She became the first Armenian equestrian ever to compete at an FEI-level championship.

Biography
Schopf was introduced to dressage while studying at the University of Southern California in Los Angeles. Born in the United States, she has competed internationally for her native country, as well as both Germany and Armenia. Both Schopf's maternal and fraternal grandparents fled Armenia during the Armenian genocide of the early twentieth century. Her maternal grandparents sought refuge in Beirut, while her fraternal grandparents sought refuge in the US by way of Azerbaijan and Georgia. She is married to German businessman and dressage rider Bernd Schopf, and divides her time between Bremen and Wellington, Florida.

Schopf competed at the 2019 European Championships in Rotterdam, where she placed 58th in the individual competition aboard her horse Saumur. In doing so, she became the first Armenian representative at any FEI-level equestrian championships.

References

External links
 

Living people
1957 births
American female equestrians
Armenian female equestrians
Armenian dressage riders
German female equestrians
American people of Armenian descent
21st-century American women